The Tanzer 31 is a Canadian sailboat, that was designed by George Cuthbertson of Cuthbertson & Cassian and first built in 1984. The design is out of production.

Production
Production of the boat was commenced in 1984 by Tanzer Industries of Dorion, Quebec. The company entered bankruptcy in May 1986 and production ended.

Design
The Tanzer 31 is a small recreational keelboat, built predominantly of fibreglass, with wood trim. It has a masthead sloop rig, a spade-style rudder and a fixed fin keel.

A  fresh water tank was also fitted.

The boat has a PHRF racing average handicap of 168 with a high of 182 and a low of 159.

Variants
Tanzer 31
Tanzer 31 Shoal-Draft

See also
List of sailing boat types

Similar sailboats
Allmand 31
Annie 30
Bahama 30
Beneteau 31
C&C 30
C&C 30 Redwing
Catalina 309
Catalina 310
CS 30
Grampian 30
Herreshoff 31
Hunter 31
Hunter 31-2
Hunter 306
Hunter 310
Hunter 320
Kirby 30
Leigh 30
Marlow-Hunter 31
Mirage 30
Mirage 30 SX
Niagara 31
Pearson 303
Roue 20
Seafarer 30
Southern Cross 28

References

Keelboats
1980s sailboat type designs
Sailing yachts
Sailboat type designs by C&C Design
Sailboat types built by Tanzer Industries